The Dahme Flood Relief Canal, or Dahme-Umflutkanal in German, is a canal in the German state of Brandenburg. Its principal purpose is to divert water from the upper reaches of the River Spree just below Leibsch, to run into the River Dahme at Märkisch Buchholz.

The canal is entered from the River Spree by a lock and is navigable downstream to Märkisch Buchholz. A weir here prevents direct access to the River Dahme, but a small inclined plane allows canoes and small craft to by-pass the weir near Märkisch Buchholz.

References
 

Canals in Brandenburg
Canals opened in 1911
1911 establishments in Germany